Entwine the Threads is the fourth EP from Finnish progressive metalcore band Circle of Contempt. It was released by Sumerian Records on 11 December 2012.

Track listing

Chart performance

Personnel
Circle of Contempt
Denis Hautaniemi – vocals 
Risto-Matti Toivonen – guitar
Ville Patrikainen – guitar
Markus Karhumäki – bass guitar 
JP Kaukonen – drums

Production
 Sami Raatikainen – production, engineering

References

2012 EPs
Circle of Contempt albums